Željko Babić (born 19 May 1972) is a Croatian retired handball player and current coach of RK Podravka Koprivnica.

Playing career
Babić had played for the following clubs: RK PIK Neretva Opuzen, Badel 1862 Zagreb, Razvitak Metković, Secchia and Pallamano Prato, and RK Jelsa. He retired from playing professional handball in 2006.

Coaching career
Babić worked as an assistant coach under the coaching staff of Slavko Goluža in the Croatian national team, winning bronze medals at the 2012 European Championship, 2012 Summer Olympics and at the 2013 World Championship, and the silver medal at the 2013 Mediterranean Games.

On 27 February 2015, he was appointed as the head coach of the Croatian national team, leading the team at the 2016 European Championship, 2016 Summer Olympics and at the 2017 World Championship. On 30 January 2017, it was reported that Babić was sacked as the head coach of the national team of Croatia due to a poor run of results and finishing fourth in the World Championship finals held in January in France.

Following the 2017–18 season, Babić was named the head coach of Slovenian club RK Gorenje Velenje. He parted ways with the club in May 2018.

On 9 January 2020, he was appointed as the head coach of RK Eurofarm Pelister in North Macedonia.

Personal life 
Babić was born in Metković in the family of mother Nedjeljka and father Ante Babić. He has brother Ivica who is a priest, and a sister. He married his wife Katarina Vukoja, with whom he has three children: twins Greta and Ivan, and a daughter Anđa.

Honours

Player
Badel 1862 Zagreb
Croatian First League: 1991–92, 1992–93, 1993–94
Croatian Cup: 1992, 1993, 1994
Yugoslav First League: 1988–89, 1990–91
Yugoslav Cup: 1991
European Champions Cup: 1991–92, 1992–93
European Super Cup: 1993

RK Metković 
Croatian Cup: 2002

Pallamano Prato
Serie A: 1998–99

Head coach
Meshkov Brest
Belarusian First League: 2013–14, 2014–15
Belarusian Cup: 2014, 2015
SEHA League runner-up: 2013–14, 2014–15

Croatia 
European Championship third place: 2016

Macedonia
Macedonian Super Cup  First Place: 2021-22

References

External links
 

Living people
Croatian male handball players
Croatian handball coaches
Sportspeople from Metković
People from Opuzen
1972 births
RK Zagreb players
Expatriate handball players
Croatian expatriate sportspeople in Italy